The 34th Women's Boat Race took place on 25 March 1979. The contest was between crews from the Universities of Oxford and Cambridge and held as part of the Henley Boat Races along a two-kilometre course.

Background
The first Women's Boat Race was conducted on The Isis in 1927.

Crews
The Cambridge crew weighed an average of 10 st 12.75 lb (69.1 kg) per rower,  more than their opponents.  Oxford saw three rowers with Boat Race experience return to the crew while Cambridge's crew featured two Blues.

Race
Cambridge won by two lengths in a time of 5 minutes 52 seconds.

See also
The Boat Race 1979

References

External links
 Official website

Women's Boat Race
1979 in English sport
Boat
March 1979 sports events in the United Kingdom
1979 in women's rowing
1979 sports events in London